The Technology Policy Institute is an independent think tank in Washington, DC dedicated to the study of technology policy. Established in 2010, its mission is "to advance knowledge and inform policymakers by producing independent, rigorous research and by sponsoring educational programs and conferences on major issues affecting information technology and communications policy." , the University of Pennsylvania ranked Technology Policy Institute among most authoritative science and technology policy think tanks in the world.

Overview

The Technology Policy Institute conducts research and publishes peer-reviewed papers, issues policy briefs, delivers congressional testimony, publishes commentary, hosts events and produces a podcast on a variety of topics related to technology policy. The institute's research has been cited in The Atlantic, Reuters, The Hill and others.

Screen time

In 2013, Scott Wallsten of the Technology Policy Institute published a study that researched screen time, specifically attempting to quantify how much less time people spend working, sleeping, and socializing at the expense of increased screen time. The study's scope was limited to "online leisure" activity (i.e. non-working screen time) and found that increased time online did equate to less time spent sleeping, studying, and socializing, among other activities.

Big Tech
In 2021, the institute described how new legislation and increased regulation for social media companies at the state level would potentially lead to increased cost of compliance and reduce overall competition.

Annual conference

Since 2010, Technology Policy Institute has hosted the Aspen Forum, an annual conference in Aspen, Colorado focused on technology policy and regulation.

Research areas

Antitrust and Competition law
Big data
Blockchain
Broadband
Economics of digitization
Evidence-based policy
Information privacy and security
Intellectual property, copyright, music licensing, and patents
Net neutrality

Board members
, the website of the Technology Policy Institute listed 10 board members.

Board of Directors
 Brian Tramont
 Scott Wallsten
 Thomas M. Lenard
 Madura Wijewardena
 Laura Martin

Board of Academic Advisors
 Shane Greenstein
 Thomas Hazlett
 Roger Noll
 Gregory Rosston
 Catherine Tucker

Reference

External links
Official website

Think tanks established in 2010
Political and economic think tanks in the United States
Science and technology think tanks
Nonpartisan organizations in the United States
Non-profit organizations based in Washington, D.C.